Michal Michalík (born 12 July 1980 in Plzeň) is a modern pentathlete from the Czech Republic. He competed at the 2004 Summer Olympics in Athens, where he finished sixth in the men's event, with a score of 5,332 points, and managed to repeat his position at the 2008 Summer Olympics in Beijing. He is currently ranked no. 37 in the world by the Union Internationale de Pentathlon Moderne (UIPM).

Michalík reached his first international success in modern pentathlon, when he won the gold medal at the 2001 World Junior Championships in Budapest, Hungary. In the following year, he was admitted to the national team, and continued to achieve his best results in modern pentathlon, including his third-place finish at the 2003 World Championships in Pesaro, Italy, and two team and relay medals at the 2007 World Championships in Berlin, Germany.

References

External links
  (archived page from Pentathlon.org)

1980 births
Living people
Czech male modern pentathletes
Olympic modern pentathletes of the Czech Republic
Modern pentathletes at the 2004 Summer Olympics
Modern pentathletes at the 2008 Summer Olympics
World Modern Pentathlon Championships medalists
Sportspeople from Plzeň
University of West Bohemia alumni